A sun temple is a building used for spiritual activities dedicated to the sun or a solar deity.

Sun Temple or Temple of the Sun may also refer to:

Temples
Sun Temple (Sogamoso), in Colombia
Sun Temple, Modhera in Gujarat, India
Konark Sun Temple, in Odisha, India
Martand Sun Temple in Jammu and Kashmir, India
Multan Sun Temple, in Punjab, Pakistan
Temple of the Sun (Beijing) or Ritan, site of a Ming Dynasty altar, now a public park, in China
Temple of the Sun (Rome), in ancient Rome
Egyptian sun temple, ancient Egyptian temples to the sun god Ra, including:
Sun Temple of Userkaf

Other uses
Temple of the Sun (Utah), a summit in Capitol Reef National Park, Utah, US

See also
Solar deity